Ben Loomis  (born 9 June 1998) is an American Nordic combined skier. He competed at the 2018 Winter Olympics and has been selected to represent Team USA at the upcoming 2022 Winter Olympics.

Career
In 2016, Loomis won the Youth Cup in Trondheim, Norway. Loomis competed in the 2014, 2015, 2016, 2017, and 2018 International Ski Federation Junior World Championships and came in 7th place (team normal hill/4x5K) in 2015 and 2017 and 6th place in 2016. During the 2018 Junior World Championships, Loomis finished 3rd in the 10k individual Gunderson event and 4th in the 5k individual Gunderson event. Loomis also competed in the 2017, 2019, and 2021 World Championships. At the 2021 World Championships, Loomis posted a 31st-place finish in the 10k individual Gundersen event. During the 2021-2022 World Cup season, Loomis posted a 12th-place finish at the Val di Fiemme World Cup, a personal best World Cup result, and the top World Cup finish by a USA Nordic Athlete since 2018. Currently, Loomis is ranked as the top American within the Nordic Combined World Cup Standings.

Olympic career
In 2016, Loomis won the silver medal in Nordic combined at the 2016 Winter Youth Olympics, which was the first U.S. medal in the sport at a Youth Games. Loomis was named the 2016 USSA Nordic Combined Athlete of the Year by the United States Ski and Snowboard Association.

Nordic Combined Youth Olympics

In 2018, Loomis was nominated for the 2018 Winter Olympics held in Pyeongchang, Korea, where he competed in all three events.

2018 Winter Olympics Men's Gundersen LH HS140/10.0k

Loomis was selected to represent the United States at the upcoming 2022 Winter Olympics in Beijing, China.

Personal life
Ben Loomis grew up ski jumping at the Flying Eagles Ski Club in Eau Claire, Wisconsin. After watching his older brother Adam try the sport, he followed suit. He started at age five and began traveling around the midwest for competitions.

At the age of 15, Loomis moved to Park City, Utah, to ski and attend the Winter Sports School, from which he graduated.

In 2019, Loomis was selected into the U.S. Army World Class Athlete Program and is a specialist with the Utah National Guard.

References

1998 births
Living people
People from Eau Claire, Wisconsin
American male Nordic combined skiers
American military Olympians
Olympic Nordic combined skiers of the United States
Nordic combined skiers at the 2018 Winter Olympics
Nordic combined skiers at the 2022 Winter Olympics
Nordic combined skiers at the 2016 Winter Youth Olympics
Youth Olympic silver medalists for the United States
United States Army soldiers
Utah National Guard personnel